"Zutto Futari de" is the fourth single by Beni on the Universal Japan label. The leading song is a theme song for Recochoku as well as the program UtaSta while "With U" is an Orion Beer commercial song and the theme song for Go! Shiodome Jamboree Wasshoi 2009. The leading song Zutto Futari de debuted on 15 July 2009, at the #2 place on the Recochoku download. The second day the song rose to the #1 position. After three days the song went back to its #2 place.
It was later announced that the official track list of the single would include a cover of "The Boy Is Mine" featuring Tynisha Keli.

Track listing 
 Zutto Futari de (ずっと二人で; Always the Two of Us)
 stardust
 With U
 The Boy is Mine feat. Tynisha Keli

Charts

Total Reported Sales:1,251

References

2009 singles
Beni (singer) songs
2009 songs